Talara barema is a moth in the subfamily Arctiinae. It was described by William Schaus in 1896. It is found in São Paulo, Brazil.

References

Arctiidae genus list at Butterflies and Moths of the World of the Natural History Museum

Moths described in 1896
Lithosiini